Hose House No. 2 may refer to:
Hose House No. 2 (Idaho Springs, Colorado), listed on the NRHP in Clear Creek County, Colorado
Alpine Hose Company No. 2, in Georgetown, Colorado, listed on the NRHP in Clear Creek County, Colorado
Hose House No. 2 (Beverly, Massachusetts), also NRHP-listed